Adnan Adel Tawfiq Ghaith (Arabic: عدنان غيث) (46) is a member of Fatah's Revolutionary Council and is the Palestinian Authority's (PA) governor for the Quds Governorate since August 2018. He has been a life-long Fatah activist and lives in Jerusalem's Silwan neighbourhood in the West Bank.

Ghaith was the Fatah movement secretary in Silwan and one of the leaders of the People's Committee in the Al-Bustan neighbourhood of Jerusalem which has led local opposition to the "City of David" archaeological-tourist park. Because of his position and activities he has been arrested several times by Israel.

In 2011, Ghaith, at the time Fatah Secretary-General, was banned from entering Jerusalem for eight months.

On November 25, 2018, Ghaith was arrested along with 40 other members of the Fatah movement but released only a week later. His lawyer claimed that the Israeli authorities tried to harass him. His previous arrest was in October. He was subsequently banned from entering the Israeli-occupied West Bank for six months.

In February 2020, Ghaith was again banned from the West Bank for six months.

In July 2020, Ghaith was again arrested and was, according to his lawyers, investigated, over "planning an act of terrorism" but then released on August 4, 2020. It was his third arrest in 2020 and his 17th since he was appointed governor in 2018. In September, Israel issued him an order preventing him from meeting with many PA officials, including President Mahmoud Abbas and Prime Minister Mohammed Shtayyeh.

See also 
 Quds Governorate

External links 
 Israeli security forces arrest Ghaith (video), April 5, 2020. PLO-NAD. Twitter.
 Why is Israel after Adnan Ghaith?, November 11, 2019. Ahmad Melhem. Al-Monitor.

References

Fatah members
Palestinian politicians
People from Jerusalem
Governors of Jerusalem Governorate
20th-century Palestinian people
Living people
Year of birth missing (living people)
Palestinian people imprisoned by Israel